Milldale is a neighborhood in the incorporated town of Southington, Hartford County, Connecticut.

External links
 Town of Southington (official site)

Southington, Connecticut
Populated places in Hartford County, Connecticut
Neighborhoods in Connecticut